Arthgal ap Dyfnwal (died 872) was a ninth-century king of Alt Clut. He descended from a long line of rulers of the British Kingdom of Alt Clut. Either he or his father, Dyfnwal ap Rhydderch, King of Alt Clut, may have reigned when the Britons are recorded to have burned the Pictish ecclesiastical site of Dunblane in 849.

In 870, the seat of Arthgal's realm—the island fortress of Alt Clut—was besieged by the Viking kings Amlaíb and Ímar. After four months, the fortress fell to the Vikings, who are recorded to have transported a vast prey of British, Pictish, and English captives back to Ireland. The fall of Alt Clut marked a watershed in the history of Arthgal's realm. Afterwards, the capital of the kingdom appears to have relocated up the River Clyde to the vicinity of Govan and Partick, and became known as the Kingdom of Strathclyde.

Two years after the fall of Alt Clut, Arthgal is recorded to have been assassinated at the behest of Causantín mac Cináeda, King of the Picts. The circumstances surrounding Arthgal's death are uncertain. Whilst it is possible he was captured by the Vikings in 870 and slain whilst still in captivity, it is also possible that he was reigning as king when he died. The fact that Arthgal's succeeding son, Rhun, was Causantín's brother-in-law could be evidence that Arthgal was killed to make way for Rhun. Another possibility is that, following the destruction of Alt Clut, Arthgal ruled as a puppet king under the Vikings. If so, this could also account for Causantín's actions. On the other hand, Causantín may have merely acted out of sheer opportunism, and Rhun may have succeeded to the throne without his assistance. In any event, either Arthgal or Rhun could have been the first kings to rule as King of Strathclyde.

Family

According to a pedigree preserved within a collection of tenth-century Welsh genealogical material known as the Harleian genealogies, Arthgal descended from a long line of kings of Alt Clut. The genealogy specifies that Arthgal was the son of Dyfnwal ap Rhydderch, King of Alt Clut, an otherwise unknown ruler.

In about 849, the ninth- to twelfth-century Chronicle of the Kings of Alba reports that Britons burned Dunblane, a Pictish ecclesiastical centre seated on the southern Pictish border. This attack took place during the reign of Cináed mac Ailpín, King of the Picts, and may have been overseen by either Arthgal or Dyfnwal. This notice of penetration into Pictish territory is the first record of British activity since the midpoint of the eighth century. The razing of Dunblane could be evidence that the British Kingdom of Alt Clut was in the process of extending its authority at the expense of the Pictish regime. If so, the kings of Alt Clut would appear to have seized upon the chaos wrought by contemporaneous Viking attacks upon the Picts.

King of Alt Clut

In 870, the fifteenth- to sixteenth-century Annals of Ulster, and the eleventh-century Fragmentary Annals of Ireland reveal that the insular Scandinavian kings Amlaíb and Ímar laid siege to Alt Clut, and succeeded in capturing the fortress after a blockade of four months. The destruction of Alt Clut is also documented by Welsh sources such as the eleventh- to thirteenth-century Annales Cambriæ, and the thirteenth- and fourteenth-century texts Brenhinedd y Saesson and Brut y Tywysogyon. The fact that such far-off sources make note of the event may exemplify the alarm caused by the Vikings' successes throughout Britain. According to Fragmentary Annals of Ireland, Alt Clut only fell to attacks after the well went dry. One possibility is that the Vikings had successfully secured control of the well that saddles Dumbarton Rock, thereby denying the Britons access to fresh water.

The following year, the twelfth-century Chronicon Scotorum, the Annals of Ulster, and the Fragmentary Annals of Ireland reveal that Amlaíb and Ímar returned to Ireland with a fleet of two hundred ships, and a mass of captives identified as English, British, and Pictish. The exportation of these people to Ireland is also attested by Annales Xantenses, a ninth-century German source. The captives could have been meant for ransom, or may have been intended for the Dublin slave market. It is possible that Arthgal and his family were amongst those imprisoned.

The reasons behind the attack are uncertain. On one hand, it is possible that Alt Clut was targeted because it was regarded as a rich target. On the other hand, the remarkable duration of the siege could indicate that, instead of merely plundering Arthgal's realm, Amlaíb and Ímar specifically sought and succeeded in capturing the capital. It could be that Amlaíb and Ímar regarded the kings of Alt Clut as an active threat to their maritime interests, and that the fortress of Alt Clut served the Britons much like how  were utilised as naval bases by the Vikings in Ireland. The destruction of the citadel may have allowed the Vikings to gain unrestricted access into central Scotland. On one hand, the recorded ethnicity of the Vikings' captives could reveal that the Britons of Alt Clut possessed many English and Pictish slaves or subjects. On the other hand, the recorded ethnicities may be evidence that Alt Clut's fall was the only recorded incident in what may have been a series of coeval Viking campaigns in the region, and may indicate that Amlaíb and Ímar not only established overlordship over the Strathclyde British, but that they also asserted power over the English of Lothian and throughout the Pictish realm. Although it is possible that the Scandinavians sought a connecting route between Dublin and York, the fact that there are no waterways or suitable portages that bridge the Firth of Clyde and the Firth of Forth may well be evidence against this. The fact that the Fragmentary Annals of Ireland seems to show that Amlaíb promptly returned to Britain in about 872 could be evidence that the assault on Alt Clut was undertaken in the context of territorial conquest/control rather than the mere acquisition of portable wealth.

Death and succession

Arthgal died in 872. The Annals of Ulster and Chronicon Scotorum reveal that he was slain at the behest of Causantín mac Cináeda, King of the Picts. Rhun, Arthgal's only known son, is the last king to be listed in the Harleian pedigree that pertains to Arthgal.

If Rhun succeeded Arthgal—as seems likely—it is uncertain how long he outlived him. Despite Causantín's part in Arthgal's demise, Rhun is otherwise known to have married a sister of Causantín at some point. Although the circumstances surrounding Arthgal's assassination are unknown, the familial relationship between Causantín and Rhun could be evidence that Arthgal's demise was orchestrated to allow Rhun gain the throne. One possibility is that Rhun had been exiled from his father's realm, and had been living at the Pictish royal court when Amlaíb and Ímar commenced their campaign. This could mean that Causantín acted to offset any rival Rhun had in regard to the British kingship. Conversely, if there was no strife between Rhun and Arthgal, Causantín's actions against the latter could have been carried out in the context of an intrusive and aggressive neighbour.

Arthgal's elimination may have been carried out in the context of an attempt by Causantín to capitalise upon the political turmoil wrought by the Viking onslaught. The destruction of Alt Clut marks the last time the fortress appears on record until the thirteenth century. Although the site could have served as a Viking military base following the British defeat, there is no archaeological evidence evincing its use as a seat of lordship until later centuries. Perhaps the site was discredited, and came to be regarded as unsuitable to the ruling dynasty thereafter. Certainly, the British capital appears to have shifted up the River Clyde to the vicinity of Govan and Partick. Whilst the former site—on the north bank of the River Clyde—appears to have been utilised by Arthgal's eighth-century predecessors, the latter site—on the south bank—could well have been used at least a century earlier.

This relocation of the capital seems to be borne out by surviving documentary sources. Until the fall of Alt Clut, for example, the rulers of the realm were styled after the fortress. After the loss of this site, the Kingdom of Alt Clut came to be known as the Kingdom of Strathclyde in consequence of its reorientation towards Ystrat Clut (Strathclyde), the valley of the River Clyde. Arthgal himself is styled King of the Strathclyde Britons upon his death in 872—the first use of this terminology by Irish sources. Whilst it is possible that Arthgal met his end in Ireland at the hands of his Viking captors, the title accorded to him on his death could be evidence that he had instead been ruling the new Kingdom of Strathclyde. In fact, it is possible that he or Rhun was the first monarch to rule this realm.

There is also reason to suspect that Arthgal's death occurred in the context of conflict with the Picts. For example, the twelfth-century Prophecy of Berchán attributes four victories to Causantín, with the fourth described as that of —a location possibly identical to Glasgow—where he overcame the "king of the Britons of the green mantles". This source, coupled with Arthgal's obituaries, could indicate that Causantín had Arthgal executed or assassinated after defeating him in battle. Such an event may account for the specific records of Causantín's role in Arthgal's demise. Another possibility is that, following the conquest of Alt Clut, Arthgal ruled as a puppet king under Amlaíb and Ímar. Certainly, the Vikings utilised royal puppets in the conquered English kingdoms of Northumbria and East Anglia. A similar relationship between Arthgal and Viking power could explain Causantín's role in Arthgal's demise, and could explain how Rhun succeeded to the throne. There is also reason to suspect that, as a result of Rhun's assumption of power, Causantín gained overlordship over the kingdom. In any event, Arthgal's apparent elimination at Causantín's instigation would appear to have rid the Picts of a neighbouring adversary, and would have served to increase Causantín's authority and reputation.

Ancestry

Notes

Citations

References

Primary sources

Secondary sources

9th-century Scottish monarchs
872 deaths
Monarchs of Strathclyde